Makati's 2nd congressional district is one of the two congressional districts of the Philippines in the city of Makati. It has been represented in the House of Representatives of the Philippines since 1998. The district consists of barangays in eastern Makati, namely Cembo, Comembo, East Rembo, Guadalupe Nuevo, Guadalupe Viejo, Pembo, Pinagkaisahan, Pitogo, Post Proper Northside, Post Proper Southside, Rizal, South Cembo and West Rembo. It is currently represented in the 19th Congress by Luis Jose Campos Jr. of the Nationalist People's Coalition (NPC).

Representation history

Election results

2022

2019

2016

2013

2010

2007

See also
Legislative districts of Makati

References

Congressional districts of the Philippines
Politics of Makati
1995 establishments in the Philippines
Congressional districts of Metro Manila
Constituencies established in 1995